Balkan music is a type of music found in the Balkan region of southeastern Europe. The music is characterised by complex rhythm. Famous bands in Balkan music include Taraf de Haïdouks, Fanfare Ciocărlia, and No Smoking Orchestra.

Historical musical influences

Byzantine medieval music

Byzantine music (Greek: Βυζαντινή Μουσική) is associated with the medieval sacred chant of Christian Churches following the Constantinopolitan rite. Its modal system is based on the ancient Greek models. The development of large scale hymnographic forms begins in the fifth century with the rise of the kontakion, a long and elaborate metrical sermon, which finds its acme in the work of Romanos the Melodist (sixth century). Heirmoi in syllabic style are gathered in the Irmologion, a bulky volume which first appeared in the middle of the tenth century and contains over a thousand model troparia arranged into an octoechos (the eight-mode musical system) and the whole system of Byzantine music which is closely related to the music of ancient Greece.

Greek music

Greek folk music includes Demotika, Cretan and Nisiotika, Pontian, Laiko and Rebetiko. Greek music developed around the Balkans as a synthesis of elements of the music of the various areas of the Greek mainland and the Greek islands, with Greek Orthodox ecclesiastical chant, and a reference to music of Crete and Byzantine music. The music of the Aegean Islands, are known for Nisiótika songs; Greek characteristics vary widely. Crete has a well known folk dance tradition; it includes swift dances like pentozalis. Most of the Greek folk songs are accompanied by Greek musical instruments like: lira, clarinet, guitar, violin and sometimes mandolin. Greek folk dances include Kalamatianos, Syrtos and Sousta.

Ottoman music

Dimitrie Cantemir was a composer of Ottoman music.
Many musical instruments were introduced to the Balkans during the time of Ottoman control, but many Ottoman instruments were borrowed by the locals.

"Balkan" is a Turkish word which means sharp mountains. As this the influence of Mehter and Turkish rhythms and melodies can be seen in Balkan Music. In the 19th century in imitation of the Turkish military bands which replaced the mehterhâne formations of Janissary Turks beginning in 1828. Apparently, as in Turkey, they dethroned the ancient traditional oboe (zurna, zurla, or mizmar) and double-membraned drum ensembles.

Pre-modern Balkan music

Traditional Bulgarian music
Traditional folk instruments in Bulgarian music include various kinds of bagpipes (gaida and kaba gaida); drums (tapan); tarambuka; bells; daire; clapper; zilmasha; praportsi. Woodwind diple: zurla; kaval; duduk; dvoyanka;  ocarina; accordion.
String instruments: gadulka; tambura; fiddle; mandolin; guitar and gusle.

Traditional Serbian music
During the Nemanjic dynasty, musicians played an important role in the royal court, and were known as sviralnici, glumci and praskavnici. Other rulers known for the musical patronage included Stefan Dušan, Stefan Lazarević, and Đurađ Branković. Medieval musical instruments included horns, trumpets, lutes, psalteries and cymbals.

Derivatives and world music

Romanian and Romani brass band
Fanfare Ciocărlia  got many fans in Europe with their powerful brass sound appealing to rock and rave fans as well as the world music audience. In 1997 Ernst and Neumann took Fanfare Ciocărlia into Bucharest's Studio Electrecord to record their debut album. The album, Radio Pascani, was released on the Berlin record label Piranha Musik in 1998 and proved an instant success. Another popular band in Romania was Taraf de Haïdouks.

Progressive Balkan folk
Progressive Balkan folk has seen rise in many western countries, particularly the United States. It has had its greatest success with progressive communities across the country. Younger American generations are discovering the possibilities of this genre and are bringing it to small clubs and festivals across the US.

The upbeat, dramatic tone of the music has also attracted a following in the Tribal Fusion bellydance community. Tribal Fusion does not claim to emulate traditional dances, costume or music styles strictly, but it does draw inspiration from Balkan traditions.

Balkan soul and funk
Bay Area, CA band Inspector Gadje plays mainly traditional and contemporary balkan dance tunes, but because of the varied background of its musicians, elements of jazz and experimental music can be heard.

Brooklyn-based Slavic Soul Party! is a virtuoso ensemble of brass musicians that infuse traditional balkan rhythms and beats with jazz, soul, funk and the energy of dance pop.

British based band Sam and the Womp have rooted their music in the Balkan funk style to create a modern feel along with catchy and energetic rhythm.

Oakland, CA based artist Balkan Bump mixes Eastern European diasporic music with Electronic Music and Hip Hop.

Flamenco Balkan crossover
Another popular exploration has been between Balkan music and other styles around the Mediterran like Flamenco, Jazz and Middle-Eastern music.  Vancouver based act Ivan Tucakov and Tambura Rasa explores this style and beyond.

Balkan beats 
Traditional Balkan music mixed with modern, electronic beats: this genre first appeared in the Berlin underground scene in the mid-1990s. The term was coined by Berlin DJ Robert Soko, whose BalkanBeats monthly parties still continue nowadays. It then spread to the European and world scene, to become an established genre nowadays.

Music per country and ethnicity
Music of Albania
Aromanian music
Music of Bosnia and Herzegovina
Music of Bulgaria
Music of Croatia
Music of Cyprus
Music of Greece
Music of Kosovo
Music of Moldova
Music of Montenegro
Music of North Macedonia
Romani music
Music of Romania
Music of Serbia
Music of Slovenia
Music of Turkey

Notable artists

Aleksandër Peçi
 Avni Mula
 Tish Daija
 Elhaida Dani
 Elvana Gjata
 Simon Gjoni
 Tonin Harapi
 Inva Mula
 Ermonela Jaho
 Akil Mark Koci
 Feim Ibrahimi
 Prenkë Jakova
 Parashqevi Simaku
 Palokë Kurti
 Aleksandër Peçi
 Vasil Tole
 Çesk Zadeja
 Nikolla Zoraqi
 David Tukiçi
 Pirro Çako
 Vaçe Zela
 Tefta Tashko-Koço

Sofi Marinova
 Preslava
 Raina Kabaivanska
 Ivan Shopov
 Valya Balkanska
 Lyubka Rondova
 Ivo Papazov
 Theodosii Spassov
 Stoyan Yankoulov
 Elitsa Todorova
 Lili Ivanova
 Nicolai Ghiaurov
 Miro
 Maria Ilieva
 Poli Genova
 Papi Hans
 Gergana

Adnan Babajić
 Al' Dino (Aldin Kurić)
 Alen Islamović
 Alma Čardžić
 Amir Kazić Leo
 Asim Brkan
 Azra Kolaković
 Baja Mali Knindža
 Beba Selimović
 Bijelo Dugme
 Boris Novković
 Crvena jabuka
 Dado Džihan
 Davor Badrov
 Fuad Backović
 Dejan Matić
 Dina Bajraktarević
 Dino Merlin
 Disciplinska komisija
 Divlje jagode
 DJ Krmak
 Dubioza kolektiv
 Duško Kuliš
 Edo Mulahalilović
 Edo Maajka (Edin Osmić)
 Eldin Huseinbegović
 Elvidin Krilić
 Elvir Laković Laka
 Enes Begović
 Erato
 Esad Plavi
 Frenkie
 Goran Bregović
 Halid Bešlić
 Halid Muslimović
 Hamdija Čustović
 Hanka Paldum
 Haris Džinović
 Hari Mata Hari
 Himzo Polovina
 Indira Radić
 Jasmin Muharemovic
 Kemal Malovčić
 Kemal Monteno
 Lepa Brena
 Maja Sarihodžić
 Marinko Rokvić
 Marta Savić
 Mate Bulić
 Maya Berović
 Meho Puzić
 Mile Kitić
 Milena Plavšić
 Miloš Bojanić
 Mirjana Bajraktarević
 Mitar Mirić
 Mladen Vojičić Tifa
 Mostar Sevdah Reunion
 Nada Topčagić
 Nikola/Amir "Nino" Rešić
 Nedeljko Bajić Baja
 Nervozni poštar
 Nihad Alibegović
 Nihad Kantić - Šike
 Osman Hadžić
 Romana (singer)
 Safet Isović
 Sanela Sijerčić
 Sanja Maletić
 Saša Matić
 Sateliti
 Seid Memić
 Sejo Boy
 Seka Aleksić
 Selma Bajrami
 Šemsa Suljaković
 Šerif Konjević
 Silvana Armenulić
 Tomo Miličević – Thirty Seconds to Mars
 Vukašin Brajić
 Zaim Imamović
 Zdravko Čolić
 Zehra Deović
 Željko Bebek
 Željko Samardžić

Antonija Šola
 Arsen Dedić
 Azra
 Branimir Štulić
 Claudia Beni
 Dado Topić
 Damir Urban
 Danijela Martinović
 Darko Domijan
 Darko Rundek
 Denis & Denis
 Dino Dvornik
 Đorđe Novković
 Doris Dragović
 Dražen Zečić
 Gabi Novak
 Ivica Šerfezi
 Ivo Robić
 Jelena Rozga
 Josipa Lisac
 Jurica Pađen
 Jura Stublić i Film
 Kićo Slabinac
 Lana Jurčević
 Luka Nižetić
 Magazin
 Majke
 Maja Blagdan
 Maja Šuput
 Meri Cetinić
 Miroslav Škoro
 Mišo Kovač
 Mladen Grdović
 Neda Ukraden
 Neno Belan
 Nina Badrić
 Novi fosili
 Oliver Dragojević
 Parni Valjak
 Petar Grašo
 Prljavo kazalište
 Radojka Šverko
 Severina
 Shorty (rapper)
 Siniša Vuco
 Srebrna krila
 Tereza Kesovija
 Tomislav Ivčić
 Tonči Huljić
 Tony Cetinski
 Vice Vukov
 Vinko Coce
 Zdenko Runjić
 Zlatan Stipišić Gibonni

Mikis Theodorakis
Tolis Voskopoulos
Marinella
George Dalaras
Maria Farantouri
Mario Frangoulis
Demis Roussos
Helena Paparizou
Eleftheria Eleftheriou
Vicky Moscholiou
Nana Mouskouri
Argyris Nastopoulos
Apostolos Nikolaidis
Marika Ninou
Anna Vissi
Antique (duo)
Apostolia Zoi
Chryspa
Despina Vandi
Elli Kokkinou
Giorgos Papadopoulos
George Michael
Loukas Daralas
Hrysoula Stefanaki
Chronis Aidonidis
Peter André
Annette Artani
Eleftheria Arvanitaki
Agnes Baltsa
Haris Alexiou
Dionysis Makris
Kelly Kelekidou
Nancy Alexiadi
Notis Sfakianakis
Katy Garbi
Kostas Martakis
Panos Tserpes
Marianda Pieridi
Konstantinos Christoforou
Paschalis Terzis
Maria Callas
Panos Kiamos
Nikos Vertis
Giorgos Perris
Sakis Rouvas
Thanos Petrelis
Vasilis Karras
Thanos Kalliris
Nektaria Karantzi
Giorgos Mazonakis
Dimitris Mitropanos
Vicky Leandros
Labis Livieratos
Mando
Lisa Andreas
Marlen Angelidou
Lindsay Armaou
Lia Vissi
Peggy Zina
Marianna Zorba
Theodosia Tsatsou
Mariana Efstratiou
Elpida
Evridiki
Loukas Giorkas
Popi Maliotaki
Aris Christofellis
Constantinos Christoforou
Cleopatra
Natassa Theodoridou
Marios Tokas
Michalis Rakintzis
Antonis Remos
Babis Tsertos
Prodromos Kathiniotis
Stelios Kazantzidis
Alex Varkatzas

Tingulli 3nt
 Unikkatil
 Lyrical Son
 Era Istrefi
 Majk (rapper)
 DJ Regard
 Dafina Zeqiri
 Adelina Ismajli
 Genta Ismajli
 Nora Istrefi
 Vedat Ademi
 Ardian Bujupi
 Capital T
 MC Kresha
 Leonora Jakupi
 Ermal Fejzullahu
 Nexhmije Pagarusha
 Lorenc Antoni
 Mark Marku
 Nevena Božović
 Kidda

Aleksandar Belov
Adrian Gaxha
Andrijana Janevska
Bobi Andonov
Bojana Atanasovska
"Bravo Band"
Dani Dimitrovska
Elena Petreska
Elena Risteska
Elvira Rahić
Elvir Mekić
Eva Nedinkovska
Ipče Ahmedovski
Jašar Ahmedovski
Kaliopi
Karolina Gočeva
Kristina Arnaudova
Lambe Alabakoski
Martin Vučić
Muharem Serbezovski
Riste Tevdoski
Simon Kiselicki
Tamara Todevska
Tijana Dapčević
Toše Proeski
Vaska Ilieva
Vlado Janevski
Vlatko Lozanoski
Vrčak
Zoran Vanev

Andrea Demirović
 Bojan Marović
 Boban Rajović
 Dado Polumenta
 Daniel (Montenegrin singer)
 Ekrem Jevrić
 Goga Sekulić
 Goran Vukošić
 Jadranka Barjaktarović
 Kaja (singer)
 Knez (singer)
 Milomir Miljanić
 Sanja Đorđević
 Šako Polumenta
 Sergej Ćetković
 Vanja Radovanović
 Vlado Georgiev
 Vesna Zmijanac
 Who See
 Zoran Kalezić

Adrian Enescu
 Alexandra Stan
 Alina Eremia
 Anna Lesko
 Antonia Iacobescu
 Connect-R
 Dan Balan
 Dan Bittman
 Delia Matache
 Edward Maya
 Elena Gheorghe
 Fanfare Ciocărlia
 Gică Cristea
 Inna
 Ionica Minune
 Loredana Groza
 Luminiţa Anghel
 Mahala Rai Banda
 Marcel Pavel
 Mădălina Manole
 Monica Anghel
 Nico (Romanian singer)
 Octave Octavian Teodorescu
 Smiley
 Ștefan Bănică, Jr.
 Taraf de Haïdouks
 Vlad Miriţă

Aca Lukas
 Aco Pejović
 Ana Nikolić
 Bajaga i Instruktori
 Belo Platno
 Beogradski Sindikat
 Bilja Krstić
 Boban Marković
 Ceca
 Dalibor Andonov Gru
 Danijel Pavlović
 Dara Bubamara
 Darko Lazić (singer)
 Dragan Kojić Keba
 Dragana Mirković
 Džej Ramadanovski
 Dženan Lončarević
 Đani
 Đogani
 Đorđe Balašević
 Đorđe Novković
 Emina Jahović
 Era Ojdanić
 Félix Lajkó
 Goca Tržan
 Hasan Dudić
 Ivana Selakov
 Jana (singer)
 Janika Balázs
 Jelena Karleuša
 Jelena Tomašević
 Katarina Grujic
 Katarina Zivkovic
 Lepa Lukić
 Maja Marijana
 Maya Berović
 Marija Šerifović
 Mia Borisavljević
 Milan Stanković
 Milica Pavlović
 Milica Todorović
 Mina Kostić
 Mira Škorić
 Miroslav Ilić
 Nataša Bekvalac
 Nataša Đorđević
 Nemanja Nikolić (singer)
 Nikolija
 No Smoking Orchestra
 Novica Urošević
 Novica Zdravković
 Olivera Katarina
 Olja Karleuša
 Predrag Cune Gojković
 Predrag Živković Tozovac
 Rada Manojlović
 Šaban Bajramović
 Šaban Šaulić
 Sanja Ilić
 Saša Kovačević
 Sejo Kalač
 Seka Aleksić
 Šeki Bihorac
 Šeki Turković
 Sinan Alimanović
 Sinan Sakić
 Slobodan Trkulja
 Snežana Babić
 Stoja
 Suzana Jovanović
 Svetlana Spajić
 Svetlana Tanasić
 Tanja Savić
 Toma Zdravković
 Predrag Živković Tozovac (Folk)
 Vera Matović
 Verica Šerifović
 Vesna Zmijanac
 Viki Miljković
 Željko Joksimović
 Željko Šašić
 Zlata Petrović
 Zorica Brunclik
 Zvonko Bogdan

Barış Manço
 Simge
 Tarkan
 Mustafa Ceceli
 Mustafa Sandal
 Sezen Aksu
 Serdar Ortaç
 Sertab Erener
 Candan Erçetin
 Ajda Pekkan
 Melih Kibar
 Timur Selçuk
 Suzan Kardeş
 Emina Jahović
 Mehmet Erdem
 Erol Evgin

Musical groups elsewhere
Corvus Corax
Beirut
A Hawk And A Hacksaw
Balkan Beat Box
Molotov Jukebox
Balkan Ethno Orchestra
Petrojvic Blasting Company

See also
Balkan brass
Balkan jazz
Balkan Music Awards
Byzantine music
Greek folk music
Klezmer (Eastern European Jewish music)
Pop-folk

References

Further reading
Mhlongo, Zinaida. «'Hopa!': exploring Balkanology in South African popular culture». Diss. 2014.
Lauseviâc, Mirjana. A Different Village: international folk dance and Balkan music and dance in the United States. UMI, 1999.
Marković, Aleksandra. "Goran Bregović, the Balkan Music Composer." Ethnologia Balkanica; 12 (2008): 9–23.
Dawe, Kevin. Regional Voices in a National Soundscape: Balkan music and dance in Greece. (2007): 175–192.
Buchanan, Donna A., ed. Balkan Popular Culture and the Ottoman Ecumene: Music, Image, and Regional Political Discourse. Scarecrow Press, 2007.
Kremenliev, Boris. "Social and Cultural Changes in Balkan Music." Western Folklore; 34.2 (1975): 117–136.
Samson, Jim. "Borders and bridges: Preliminary thoughts on Balkan music." Musicology (497)(5) (2005): 37–55.
Rice, Timothy. "Bulgaria or Chalgaria: the attenuation of Bulgarian nationalism in a mass-mediated popular music." Yearbook for Traditional Music; 34 (2002): 25–46.
Samson, Jim. Music in the Balkans. Brill, 2013.
Kurkela, Vesa. "Music media in the Eastern Balkans: Privatised, deregulated, and neo‐traditional." International Journal of Cultural Policy; 3.2 (1997): 177–205.
Archer, Rory. "Assessing turbofolk controversies: Popular music between the nation and the Balkans." Southeastern Europe; 36.2 (2012): 178–207.
Pennanen, Risto Pekka. "Lost in scales: Balkan folk music research and the Ottoman legacy." Muzikologija; 8 (2008): 127–147.
Kovaćić, Mojca. "The Music of the Other or the Music of Ours: Balkan Music among Slovenians." First Symposium of ICTM Study Group for Music and Dance in Southeastern Europe. 2008.
Jakovljević, R. "The Fearless Vernacular: Reassessment of the Balkan Music Between Tradition and Dissolution." Muzičke prakse Balkana: etnomuzikološke perspektive : zbornik radova sa naučnog skupa održanog od 23. do 25. novembra 2011 : primljeno na X skupu Odeljenja likovne i muzičke umetnosti od 14.12.2-12, na osnovu referata akademika Dejana Despića i Aleksandra Lome = Musical practices in the Balkans : ethnomusicological perspectives : proceedings of the International Conference held November 23 to 25, 2011 : accepted at the X meeting of the Department of Fine Arts and Music of 14.12. 2012., on the basis of the review presented by Academicians Dejan Despić and Aleksandar Loma''; eds.: Dejan Despić, Jelena Jovanović, Danka Lajić-Mihajlović. Beograd: Muzikološki institut SANU,2012.
Pennanen, Risto Pekka. "Balkan Music Between East and West—Some Problems in Analysis." Research paper, University of Tampere (1994).
Shehan, Patricia K. "Balkan women as preservers of traditional music and culture." Women and Music in Cross-Cultural Perspective (1987): 45–53.
Blom, Jan-Petter. "Principles of rhythmic structures in Balkan folk music." Antropologiska Studier 25.26 (1978): 2–11.
Volcic, Zala, and Karmen Erjavec. "Constructing transnational divas: Gendered production of Balkan Turbo-folk music." (2011): 35–52.
Muršič, Rajko. The Balkans and Ambivalence of its Perception in Slovenia: the Horror of “Balkanism” and Enthusiasm for its Music. na, 2007.
Pettan, Svanibor. "Balkan Popular Music? No, Thanks: The View from Croatia." Balkan Popular Music. 1996.
Baker, Catherine. "The politics of performance: Transnationalism and its limits in former Yugoslav popular music, 1999–2004." Ethnopolitics 5.3 (2006): 275–293.
Friedman, Victor A. "Codeswitching in Balkan Urban Music." Urban Music in the Balkans: Drop-out Ethnic Identities or a Historical Case of Tolerance and Global Thinking (2006): 40–54.
Kolar, Walter W. An Introduction to Meter and Rhythm in Balkan Folk Music. Duquesne University Tamburitzans Institute of Folk Arts, 1974.
Irwin, Frances Mary. A comparison of two methods for teaching irregular meter to elementary school students using Balkan folk music. Diss. Washington University, 1984.
Burton, Kim. "Balkan beats: Music and nationalism in the former Yugoslavia." World music: The rough guide (1994): 83–94.
Archer, R. "Western, eastern and modern: Balkan pop-folk music and (trans) nationalism." C. Leccardi et al.(eds.) (1989): 187–204.
Petrovic, Ankica. "The Eastern Roots of Ancient Yugoslav Music." Music\= Cultures in Contact: Convergences and Collisions (2014): 13.
Rasmussen, Ljerka Vidić. Bosnian and Serbian popular music in the 1990s: Divergent paths, conflicting meanings, and shared sentiments. na, 2007.